Al-Khidhir Sport Club, is an Iraqi football team based in Al-Khidhir District, Al-Muthanna, that plays in the Iraq Division Two.

Managerial history
 Hussein Jassim
 Mohammed Swadi

See also 
 2001–02 Iraq FA Cup
 2002–03 Iraq FA Cup

References

External links
 Al-Khidhir SC on Goalzz.com
 Iraq Clubs- Foundation Dates

1972 establishments in Iraq
Association football clubs established in 1972
Football clubs in Muthanna